Cami Sarah Winikoff is an American film and television producer and the current president and co-founder of Sobini Films. She was invited to join the Academy of Motion Picture Arts and Sciences in 2019.

Career

Independent
Winikoff began an independent producer. Her first feature Scarecrows was released in 1988.

Trimark Pictures
Winikoff joined Trimark Pictures in August 1990. She was appointed director of production in 1991, promoted to vice president of production in 1995, and again to senior vice president in January 1997. Winikoff began to serve as executive vice president and chief administrative officer of Trimark in September 1997, where she oversaw all business, legal affairs, production, post-production, servicing and administration for the company. She also sat on the board of directors of CinemaNow.com, dedicated to the streaming and production of niche-oriented independent films.

Winikoff was promoted to chief operating officer at Trimark in 2000 and oversaw all operational facets of the company including its production arm and green-light process. This included the administration of theatrical, television, and home entertainment productions. She helped build the company and was a key player in negotiations with its merger with Lionsgate in late 2000.

At Trimark, she headed the production of over 75 films. Her production credits include Eve's Bayou, winner of Independent Spirit Awards), directed by Kasi Lemmons, starring Samuel L. Jackson; Frida, winner of two Academy Awards, starring Salma Hayek; Love and a .45 starring Renée Zellweger and Gil Bellows; Kicking and Screaming by Noah Baumbach; Kama Sutra: A Tale of Love by Mira Nair; and the Leprechaun film series.

Lionsgate
After the merger with Lionsgate, Winikoff served as its executive vice president, where she helped build the company's executive team and business plan.

Sobini Films
Winikoff was tapped as the president of Sobini Films in 2002. In her time at Sobini, she has developed a diverse range of feature films and franchises. Her credits include JT Leroy starring Kristen Stewart and Laura Dern; I'd Kill for You with her daughter Monika Wesley; Mary Shelley starring Elle Fanning; Miles Ahead starring Don Cheadle; Good Kill starring Ethan Hawke; Stonehearst Asylum starring Kate Beckinsale; An American Girl: Chrissa Stands Strong for HBO, recipient of the National Parenting Publications Gold Award; and Streets of Legend. She also produced the documentary Jujitsu-ing Reality, shortlisted for the 2013 Best Documentary Short Subject Academy Award.

She produced The Prince & Me starring Julia Stiles for Paramount Studios and its sequels. As the producer of Peaceful Warrior starring Nick Nolte, she was inspired by the film, and not satisfied by its minimal exposure, worked with Adam Fogelson of Universal Pictures to test a new marketing plan, giving away tickets at Best Buy to gain a wider audience.

She is currently developing Z, a reboot of the Zorro franchise.

Activism
Winikoff has been active in promoting dark skies in Malibu, California, as president of the Malibu Community Alliance (MCA). She negotiated with local agencies for five years to develop a new dark skies ordinance, which took effect October 15, 2018. Previously, she and the MCA settled with the Santa Monica–Malibu Unified School District over an appeal to the California Coastal Commission regarding Malibu High School's upgraded lighting in 2016. The Coastal Commission approved the settlement.

Winikoff has also served on the board of Malibu Unites, a local advocacy group that pressured the school district's handling of toxins.

Filmography

References

External links

American film studio executives
American film producers
Living people
Year of birth missing (living people)